Alston Gordon Dayton (October 18, 1857 – July 30, 1920) was a United States representative from West Virginia and a United States district judge of the United States District Court for the Northern District of West Virginia.

Education and career

Born on October 18, 1857, in Philippi, Virginia (now West Virginia), Dayton attended the public schools, read law and received an Artium Baccalaureus degree from West Virginia University in 1878, then received a Master of Arts degree in 1880 from the same institution. He was admitted to the bar and entered private practice in Philippi from 1878 to 1879, with his father Spencer Dayton. He was prosecutor for Upshur County, West Virginia from 1879 to 1884. He was prosecutor for Barbour County, West Virginia from 1884 to 1888. He resumed private practice in West Virginia from 1886 to 1895.

Congressional service

Dayton was elected as a Republican from West Virginia's 2nd congressional district to the United States House of Representatives of the 54th United States Congress and to the five succeeding Congresses and served from March 4, 1895, until his resignation March 16, 1905, to accept a federal judicial position.

Federal judicial service

Dayton was nominated by President Theodore Roosevelt on March 7, 1905, to a seat on the United States District Court for the Northern District of West Virginia vacated by Judge John Jay Jackson Jr. He was confirmed by the United States Senate on March 14, 1905, and received his commission the same day. His service terminated on July 30, 1920, due to his death in Battle Creek, Michigan. He was interred in Fraternity Cemetery in Philippi.

See also
 United States congressional delegations from West Virginia

External Links
The West Virginia & Regional History Center at West Virginia University houses the papers of Alston G. Dayton

References

Sources

 

1857 births
1920 deaths
19th-century American lawyers
20th-century American lawyers
County prosecuting attorneys in West Virginia
Judges of the United States District Court for the Northern District of West Virginia
People from Philippi, West Virginia
People from Upshur County, West Virginia
United States district court judges appointed by Theodore Roosevelt
20th-century American judges
West Virginia lawyers
West Virginia University alumni
Republican Party members of the United States House of Representatives from West Virginia
United States federal judges admitted to the practice of law by reading law